Ballester is a surname. Notable people with the surname include:

Antonio Ballester (died 1387), Archbishop of Athens, appointed by Pope Urban VI
Arturo Ballester Marco (1892–1981), Spanish artist and illustrator known for his Spanish Civil War posters
Bernabé Ballester (born 1982), Spanish footballer who plays as a central defender
Biel Ballester (born 1974), guitarist from Mallorca, Spain
Gonzalo Torrente Ballester (1910–1999), Spanish Galician writer in Spanish language
Inés Ballester (born 1958), Spanish journalist and presenter
Jean-François Ballester (born 1965), French figure skating coach
Jordi Carbonell i de Ballester (born 1924), Spanish politician and philologist
José Luis Ballester (sailor) (born 1968), Spanish sailor and Olympic Champion
José Luis Ballester (swimmer) (born 1969), former butterfly swimmer from Spain
Juan Ballester Carmenates (born 1966), Cuban painter
Lorenzo Campins y Ballester (1726–1785), Spanish born physician, founded formal studies of modern medicine in Venezuela
Manuel Ballester (born 1919), award-winning Spanish chemist
Manuel Méndez Ballester (1909–2002), writer who worked in journalism, radio broadcasting, television and teaching
Pierre Ballester (1959) is a French sports journalist
Simó Ballester (born 1457), nicknamed Simó Tort, leading figure in the social conflicts in Mallorca
Thomas Ballester (born 1987), American professional wrestler
Vicenç Albert Ballester (1872–1938), Spanish politician, Catalan nationalist, may be the designer of the "estelada"
Vicente Ballester (born 1980), former Spanish racing cyclist
Xaverio Ballester (Spanish transcription: Francisco Javier Ballester Gomez), Spanish linguist

Fictional characters
Pierre Ballester of L. A. Confidentiel, a book by David Walsh and Pierre Ballester

See also
Ballester Point, in Hurd Peninsula, Livingston Island in the South Shetland Islands, Antarctica
Ingeniero Ballester Dam, a dam on the Neuquén River, in the Argentine Patagonia
Ballester–Molina, a pistol designed and built by Argentine company Hispano Argentina Fábrica de Automotores SA
Central Ballester, an Argentine football club, based in General San Martín Partido in Greater Buenos Aires
Villa Ballester, a city located in the General San Martín Partido in Buenos Aires Province, Argentina
Balesta
Balestra (disambiguation)
Balestrero (disambiguation)
Ballesteros (disambiguation)
Baluster

Catalan-language surnames